Gouhenans is a commune in the Haute-Saône department in the region of Bourgogne-Franche-Comté in eastern France.

Coal mines were operated in the village between 1828 and 1916.

Salt mines were operating in the village between 1831 and 1945. A chemical factory (1844-1955) and a glass factory (1903-1912) were added to the complex.

See also
Communes of the Haute-Saône department

References

Communes of Haute-Saône